Epesses railway station is a railway station in the locality of Epesses, within the municipality of Bourg-en-Lavaux, in the Swiss canton of Vaud. It is an intermediate stop on the standard gauge Simplon line of Swiss Federal Railways.

Services 
 the following services stop at Epesses:

References

External links 
 
 

Railway stations in the canton of Vaud
Swiss Federal Railways stations